Herbert Harvell "Herb" Bateman (August 7, 1928 – September 11, 2000) was an American politician in Virginia. He was a nine-term member of the United States House of Representatives, serving as a Republican from 1983 until his death from natural causes in Leesburg, Virginia in 2000.

Early life
Bateman was born in Elizabeth City, North Carolina on August 7, 1928. However, he lived most of his life in Newport News, Virginia. A graduate of Newport News High School in 1945, Bateman went on to William and Mary to earn a Bachelor's degree. After graduation, he briefly taught at Hampton High School from 1949 to 1951, when he commissioned in the United States Air Force as a first lieutenant during the Korean War. He was a special agent at the U.S. Air Force Office of Special Investigations (AFOSI or OSI) and served until 1953.

Upon his return home, Bateman enrolled in the Law Center at Georgetown University, where in 1956 he earned his law degree. He served a short time as a clerk for the United States Court of Appeals in Washington, D.C. before practicing law privately in Newport News from 1968 to 1983. During this period he worked to build a political base through community activism and membership in the Virginia Jaycees. Bateman served as president of the Virginia Jaycees and National legal counsel for the United States Junior Chamber of Commerce.

Political career
Bateman was elected to the Senate of Virginia for 14 years, representing a portion of Newport News. He was originally a Democrat, but became a Republican in 1976.

In 1982, he was elected to succeed Paul S. Trible, Jr. as the representative for the 1st District in the United States House of Representatives. He won his first contest with 55 percent of the vote and was reelected eight times. He would only face another contest anywhere near that close, when Democrat Andrew Fox held him to only 51 percent of the vote. However, after the 1990 Census, most of Bateman's black constituents in Hampton and Newport News were drawn into the new 3rd district, allowing Bateman to consolidate his hold on the seat.

Bateman's voting record was moderate by Southern Republican standards; he had a lifetime rating of 79 from the American Conservative Union.  He was a strong supporter of controlling government spending.  However, he was particularly active on defense issues.  Since Newport News was a center for military work, he strongly supported military spending. He was a member of the Armed Forces and Transportation Infrastructure Committees for nearly all of his career, and chaired the House Armed Forces Subcommittee on Military Readiness and the House Merchant Marine Panel. He also served his constituents as a member of organizations such as the Virginia Jaycees, Peninsula United Way and Red Cross Blood Donor Program.

Elections
 1982 – Bateman defeated Democrat John McGlennon to win his first term in Congress; he won 55% of the vote
 1984 – Re-elected with 59% of the vote over Democrat McGlennon and Independent E. J. Green
 1986 – Re-elected with 56% of the vote over Democrat Robert Cortez Scott
 1988 – Re-elected with 73% of the vote over Democrat James S. Ellenson
 1990 – Re-elected with 51% of the vote over Democrat Andrew H. Fox
 1992 – Re-elected with 58% of the vote over Democrat Fox and Independent Donald L. Macleay
 1994 – Re-elected with 74% of the vote over Democrat Mary F. Sinclair and Independent Matt B. Voorhees
 1996 – Was unopposed for re-election
 1998 – Re-elected with 76% of the vote over Independents Josh Billings and Bradford L. Phillips

Health issues
Health was a major concern for Bateman during the 1990s. In 1990, he was diagnosed with lung and prostate cancer. In 1995, he suffered a heart attack, but was able to recover. He had surgery to remove cancer from his right lung in 1998, and had a partial blockage of a major artery removed in 1999. He was diagnosed with a cancerous lymph node in January 2000, which prompted him to not seek re-election.

Bateman died on September 11, 2000, from natural causes. He was in Leesburg, Virginia, at the time for a golf tournament. He was serving out the remainder of his ninth term at the time of his death. He is buried in Peninsula Memorial Park in Newport News, Virginia.

He and his wife, Laura, had two children, a son and daughter. His son, Herbert H. Bateman Jr., presently serves on the Newport News City Council as Vice Mayor and on the Peninsula Airport Commission.  Daughter, Laura Margaret Bateman, is the principal of Bateman Consulting, a government and public affairs consulting firm. His papers from his time as a state senator as well as from his time in Congress can be found at the Special Collections Research Center at the College of William & Mary.

See also
 List of United States Congress members who died in office
 Air Force Office of Special Investigations (AFOSI or OSI)

References

External links
 
 

1928 births
2000 deaths
20th-century American lawyers
20th-century American politicians
College of William & Mary alumni
Deaths from cancer in Virginia
Georgetown University Law Center alumni
Military personnel from Virginia
People from Elizabeth City, North Carolina
Politicians from Newport News, Virginia
Republican Party members of the United States House of Representatives from Virginia
Virginia Democrats
Virginia state senators
Virginia lawyers
United States Air Force officers